Fin Leavell, born Ciarán Ambrose Leofin Snow, is a multi-instrumentalist composer, sound designer, mixing engineer, record producer, and hobbyist video game producer known by the names Nightswim, & Galaxy Flowers.

Fin is the trombonist of political hardcore punk/skapunk band Against All Authority. He studied music theory for classical music, jazz, and electronic music at Douglas Anderson School of the Arts, and studied astrobiology in Jacksonville, FL with the late Dr. Michael D. Reynolds.

Discography

As Ciarán Snow

As Synthfucker

As Galaxy Flowers

As Nightswim

With Against All Authority

With The Summer Obsession

With Greyfield

With Start Trouble

With Clean Machine

With Bed Destroyers

With The Students

With Separation Is Natural

With Last Chance

References 

Living people
Year of birth missing (living people)
Singer-songwriters from Texas
Singer-songwriters from Florida
American rock singers
American rock songwriters
Ska
Trombonists
American male singer-songwriters